"I Should Probably Go to Bed" is a song by American country pop duo Dan + Shay. It was released on July 31, 2020, as the second single from their fourth studio album, Good Things (2021). Duo members Dan Smyers and Shay Mooney wrote the song with Sean Douglas and Jason Evigan.

Content
Dan + Shay announced the release of "I Should Probably Go to Bed" on July 31, 2020. The duo's members, Dan Smyers and Shay Mooney, wrote the song with Sean Douglas and Jason Evigan. Smyers also produced the song and played every instrument on it from his own house. Smyers told Rolling Stone that he had the song's title saved on his phone for months prior to the conception of the song. In production, Smyers included "orchestral synths and plaintive piano", as well as vocal harmonies between himself and Mooney.

Personnel
Credits by AllMusic

Shay Mooney – lead vocals, background vocals
Abby Smyers – background vocals
Dan Smyers – acoustic guitar, bass guitar, drums, piano, programming, strings, synthesizer, background vocals

Chart performance

Weekly charts

Year-end charts

Certifications

References

2020 singles
2020 songs
Dan + Shay songs
Songs written by Dan Smyers
Songs written by Shay Mooney
Songs written by Jason Evigan
Country ballads
Warner Records Nashville singles
Songs written by Sean Douglas (songwriter)